51st Infantry Brigade and Headquarters Scotland is an Adaptable Force Brigade of the British Army. It is the regional administrative formation responsible for all the units of the Army Reserve based in Scotland and an Adaptable Force Brigade under Army 2020. The Brigade is also regionally aligned with the Persian Gulf region as part of defence engagement.

Although it takes its name and identity from, and is directly descended from the 51st (Highland) Division, formed as part of the Territorial Force in 1908 and which fought during the First and Second World Wars, it is also the modern descendant of the 52nd Lowland Division.

History

World War I 
The 51st Brigade  began as a formation of the 17th (Northern) Division during the First World War. It spent the entirety of the war with the Division on the Western Front.

Cold War
Following the complete reorganisation of the Territorial Army into the Territorial and Army Volunteer Reserve (TAVR) in 1967 following the 1966 Defence White Paper, the old regional brigades and divisions were disbanded.  Among the formations which disappeared was the 51st (Highland) Division/District, which had overseen the Scottish Highlands.

The brigade level of command for the Territorial Army, was eliminated in the 1967 reforms, leaving little or no direction in doctrine or training from above.  This was resolved in 1982 with the recreation of several territorial brigades, however these new formations were purely administrative headquarters for training.  In 1982, the 51st (Highland) Infantry Brigade was formed with headquarters at Queen's Barracks, Perth taking control overall all the TA units within the Scottish Highlands.

If mobilised, 51st (Highland) Infantry Brigade would oversee Highland Zone, which encompassed the following TAORs: Orkney, Shetland, Western Isles, Highland (region), Grampians, Tayside, Fife, and Central Region.  These TAORs were further divided into several Key Points (KPs), which would nominally be guarded by Home Defence battalions, but also the new Home Service Force.  51st (Highland) Brigade encompassing the Scottish Highlands: Argyll (part of Strathclyde), Central Scotland, Kingdom of Fife, Tayside, Grampian, Highland, Western Isles, Orkney, and Shetland.  51st Infantry Brigade's primary role was that of mobile defence of the UK, with a particular emphasis on defending the military infrastructure at the UK end of the Greenland-Iceland-UK (G-I-UK) Gap alongside 52 Brigade.

Twenty-First Century 
On 1 April 2002,  51 (Scottish) Brigade took on the regional responsibility for the whole of Scotland, instead of just the Highlands, with its headquarters at Forthside Barracks in Stirling and its Regional Training Centre situated at Redford Barracks in Edinburgh. This enabled 52 (Lowland) Brigade, which previously administered all Lowland TA units, to be specifically reorganised to parent Regular light role infantry battalions for operational deployments. 51st (Scottish) Brigade also co-ordinated operational deployments within its regional area of responsibility, such as in scenarios requiring Military Aid to the Civil Community.

In April 2012, with the disbandment of 2nd Division, the brigade came under the control of the new Support Command based in Aldershot. On 31 March 2014, it was renamed 51st Infantry Brigade and Headquarters Scotland, and took on regional responsibilities as part of the Army 2020 reorganisation.

Current structure

51st Infantry Brigade 
Units forming part of 51st Infantry Brigade, include:
Headquarters 51st Infantry Brigade, at Redford Barracks, Edinburgh
Royal Scots Dragoon Guards, at Leuchars Station, Fife 
Scottish and North Irish Yeomanry, at Redford Barracks, Edinburgh 
 Black Watch, 3rd Battalion, Royal Regiment of Scotland at Fort George, Inverness
 2nd Battalion, The Rifles, at Thiepval Barracks, Lisburn
 51st Highland Volunteers, 7th Battalion, Royal Regiment of Scotland, at Queen's Barracks, Perth 
 8th Battalion, The Rifles, in Sunderland 
Balaklava Company, 5th Battalion, Royal Regiment of Scotland, at Redford Barracks, Edinburgh

Headquarters Scotland 
Headquarters Scotland, at Redford Barracks, Edinburgh, oversees all units and army estates in Scotland. Current organisations within its geographical area include:
Headquarters Scotland, at Redford Barracks, Edinburgh
 Aberdeen University Officers' Training Corps (Army Reserve), at Gordon Barracks, Aberdeen
 City of Edinburgh University Officers' Training Corps (Army Reserve), in Edinburgh
 Glasgow and Strathclyde University Officers' Training Corps (Army Reserve), in Glasgow
 Tayforth University Officers' Training Corps (Army Reserve), in Dundee
 51st (Scottish) Brigade Cadet Training Team, at Forthside Barracks, Stirling
 Lothian and Borders Battalion, Army Cadet Force, in Broxburn
 Glasgow and Lanarkshire Battalion, Army Cadet Force, in Cambuslang
 West Lowland Battalion, Army Cadet Force, in Ayr
 Black Watch Battalion, Army Cadet Force, at Queen's Barracks, Perth
 Angus and Dundee Battalion, Army Cadet Force, in Carnoustie
 1st Battalion, The Highlanders Army Cadet Force, in Dingwall
 2nd Battalion, The Highlanders Army Cadet Force, in Boddam
 Argyll and Sutherland Highlanders Battalion, Army Cadet Force, in Dumbarton

Footnotes

References

External links and sources
51st Infantry Brigade and HQ Scotland (Official Website)

51
British Army Regional Points of Command
51
Infantry brigades of the British Army in World War I
1914 establishments in the United Kingdom
Military units and formations established in 1914